The Chinese National Football League (CNFL), previously known as American Football League of China (AFLC) is an American-rules football organization in China. Founded in 2013, the AFLC has grown from a small recreational league. 92% of players in the 2016 season were Chinese nationals. In 2019, the AFLC officially renamed the organization to the CNFL.

History 

The AFLC was founded in 2013 by Chris McLaurin, a former football player for the University of Michigan Wolverines.  McLaurin, working in Chongqing at the time, helped to organize a group of locals and expatriates who were interested in football into the Chongqing Dockers, whose first season was profiled by the New Republic in The Year of the Pigskin.  After organizing the Dockers and building relationships with other football clubs that were beginning to pop up around the country, McLaurin organized a meeting of the original eight AFLC teams in Shanghai to form the league (also attended by former Michigan and NFL running back Mike Hart).  The first AFLC season featured two divisions: the Beijing Cyclones, Shanghai Titans, Shanghai Warriors and Tianjin Pirates in the East, and the Chongqing Dockers, Chengdu Mustangs, Guangzhou Tigers and Hong Kong Warhawks in the West. Not all of the early teams were accepted into the league, such as the Suzhou Blue Knights, who still play non-conference games with league teams. The 2013 season culminated in the first AFLC Championship Game at Luwan Stadium in Shanghai on January 12, 2014, and saw the Dockers defeat the Warriors 24-16 to capture the first AFLC Championship.

In 2014, the League expanded to 12 teams, shrank slightly to 10 teams in 2015, and in 2016 features 14 teams in three divisions. In 2017, the league expanded once again to feature 18 teams playing in 4 divisions.  In addition, Chris McLaurin stepped down from the commissioner role and the AFLC named Datong Wang as his successor. Chris McLaurin went on to consult various football organisations in China, including the NFL, Nike Sports Camps and Fosun Group.
In 2018, the League expanded once again to twenty teams in four divisions, and expanded to a twelve team playoff, with 4 division champions earning first round byes.

AFLC Champions

Media coverage

Coverage in Western markets 
Major media outlets such as BBC World News, ESPN, and NPR have included the AFLC in their coverage, and extensive features on McLaurin and the AFLC have printed in Time, Global Times, The Atlantic, Esquire, The New Republic, Quartz and Asean Weekly.

Coverage in Chinese markets 
The AFLC is frequently featured in local and national media around China, including extensive national coverage on Shanghai Media Group's International Channel Shanghai, CCTV 9, World Insight, QQ Sports, Sina Sports, and China Daily, as well as frequent pieces on local TV, radio, and print news in many of the AFLC's regional markets. The AFLC's strong local Chinese-language media profile owes in large part to the fundamental integration of Chinese players, managers, and league administrators into the AFLC structure.

Coverage by international football community 
The AFLC has received extensive coverage by American Football International (AFI), a leading international review of American rules football play around the world. Articles are regularly written about the league by AFI staff, and  scores and standings of AFLC games are accessible on their website.  The AFLC has also been profiled by the Gridiron Leaders’ Foundation, NFL China and NFL Hupu.

References

External links 
 AFLC Website: http://www.aflcfootball.com
 AFLC on Facebook: https://www.facebook.com/ChineseAmericanFootballAssociation
 AFLC on Weibo: http://www.weibo.com/u/5284926923

Sports leagues in China
American football leagues
American football in China
2013 establishments in China
Sports leagues established in 2013
Professional sports leagues in China